Peking Opera Blues is a 1986 Hong Kong film directed by Tsui Hark. The movie combines comedy, Hong Kong action, and serious drama with scenes involving Peking Opera.  Director Tsui Hark described the film as a satire on the "Chinese ignorance of democracy." The film was nominated for six awards at the Hong Kong Film Awards including Best Actress.

Synopsis
The film is set in 1913 Beijing, during Yuan Shikai's presidency of the country. It depicts the adventures of a team of unlikely heroines: Tsao Wan (Brigitte Lin), a patriotic rebel who dresses as a man; Sheung Hung (Cherie Chung), a woman in search of a missing box of jewels; and Bai Niu (Sally Yeh), the daughter of a Peking Opera impresario.

Title
The Chinese title translates as Knife Horse Actresses, a term used in Peking Opera to refer to male actors playing female warriors (See Dan article for details). It is sometimes erroneously translated as Knife Horse Dawn, because both words are represented by the same Chinese character.

Cast and roles
 Brigitte Lin - Tsao Wan (曹雲), General Tsao's daughter
 Cherie Chung - Sheung Hung (湘紅)
 Sally Yeh - Bai Niu (白妞)
 Kenneth Tsang - General Tsao
 Wu Ma - Mr. Wong
 Paul Chun - Fa Gum-Sao
 Mark Cheng - Ling Pak-Hoi
 Cheung Kwok Keung - Tung Man
 Ku Feng - Commander Liu
 Hoi Sang Lee - Soldier with moustache
 Leong Po-Chih	
 Sandra Ng	(cameo)
 Dean Shek		
 Yin Szema		
 Tien Ching		
 David Wu

Responses
The film grossed HK$17,559,357 in Hong Kong.

In his Wrap Up video to the Region 1 DVD of Wong Kar-wai's Chungking Express, Quentin Tarantino refers to Peking Opera Blues as "one of the greatest films ever made" and "a blast––it's a lot of fun."

Awards

References

External links 
 
 
 
 lovehkfilm entry

1986 films
1980s action comedy-drama films
Hong Kong New Wave films
1980s Cantonese-language films
Hong Kong action comedy-drama films
1980s exploitation films
Films about Peking opera
Films set in Beijing
Films set in the 1910s
Films directed by Tsui Hark
1986 action films
1986 comedy-drama films
1980s Hong Kong films